Bad Habits is the third studio album by Every Avenue.

Release
The album was announced through a YouTube video on April, 27. The song "Whatever Happened To You" was streamed on their Facebook shortly after the album announcement. The lead single, "Fall Apart", was released to radio stations on June 28, 2011. The second single "No One But You" was released on July 19, 2011, and impacted radio on August 2. The album was released on August 2, 2011, through Fearless Records. They supported Yellowcard on their headlining US tour in October and November. In February and March 2012, the group went on a co-headlining US tour with We Are the In Crowd. They were supported by Plug in Stereo, Simple as Surgery and The Audition.

Reception
The album peaked No. 63 on Billboard 200 and is the band's most successful album to date.

Track listing
All songs written and composed by David Strauchman and Jimmie Deeghan.

Personnel
David Ryan Strauchman – lead vocals, piano
Joshua Withenshaw – lead guitar
Jimmie Deeghan – rhythm guitar, vocals
Matt Black – bass guitar, vocals
Dennis Wilson – drums, percussion

Production
Aaron Sprinkle - producer, mixing, mastering

References

External links

Bad Habits at YouTube (streamed copy where licensed)

2011 albums
Every Avenue albums
Fearless Records albums
Albums produced by Aaron Sprinkle